Aston is an Australian classical pop group from Sydney formed in 2009. The band consists of members who all have come out of the Sydney Conservatorium of Music: Eliza Morrison (Violin), Michael Bennett (Violin), Hanna Oblikov (Cello), Will Henderson (Guitar), Ella Jamieson (Piano) and Daniel Luscombe (Percussion). Aston was signed to Warner Music Group after uploading an instrumental cover of Lady Gaga's Telephone to YouTube which within a month was viewed by more than 670,000 people. The cover was the most viewed Australian music video of the year. Aston has also received support from celebrity blogger Perez Hilton who featured the band on his website.

References

External links
 
 Aston at Music-covers
 YouTube Channel: astonmusic
 Facebook: astonclassical
 Twitter: astonband
 Telephone on YouTube

2009 establishments in Australia
Australian classical music groups
Musical groups established in 2009
Musical groups from Sydney